Kord Khvord-e Olya (also Romanized as Kord Khvord-e ‘Olyā and Kard Khowrd ‘Olyā; also known as Kord Khūrd-e Bālā and Kord Khvord-e Bālā) is a village in Bayat Rural District, Nowbaran District, Saveh County, Markazi Province, Iran. At the 2006 census, its population was 59, in 25 families.

References 

Populated places in Saveh County